The 2019–20 season was MKE Ankaragücü's 110th year in existence. In addition to the domestic league, MKE Ankaragücü participated in the Turkish Cup.

Squad

Süper Lig

League table

Results summary

Results by round

Matches

References
 

MKE Ankaragücü seasons
Turkish football clubs 2019–20 season